Berberis iteophylla is a species of plant in the family Berberidaceae. It is endemic to China.

References

Endemic flora of China
iteophylla
Endangered plants
Taxonomy articles created by Polbot